12 Picks is a greatest hits album by American hard rock guitarist/singer Ace Frehley. Songs 7–12 were recorded live at the Hammersmith Odeon, London, England on March 19, 1988.

Track listing

Personnel
Ace Frehley – lead guitar on all tracks, lead vocals on tracks 1-7 and 9-12, backing vocals
Tod Howarth – rhythm guitar on tracks 1-3 and 6-13, lead vocals on tracks 8 and 13, keyboards
John Regan – bass guitar and backing vocals on all tracks
Anton Fig – drums on tracks 1-2, 4 and 6
Richie Scarlet – rhythm guitar and backing vocals on tracks 4-5
Jamie Oldaker – drums on tracks 3 and all live tracks
Sandy Slavin – drums on track 5

References

Ace Frehley live albums
Albums produced by John Regan
1997 greatest hits albums
Megaforce Records compilation albums
Megaforce Records live albums
1997 live albums
Ace Frehley compilation albums